In 2006–2007, millions of people participated in protests over a proposed change to U.S. immigration policy. These large scale mobilizations are widely seen as a historic turn point in Latino politics, especially Latino immigrant civic participation and political influence, as noted in a range of scholarly publications in this field. The protests began in response to proposed legislation known as H.R. 4437, which would raise penalties for illegal immigration and classify illegal aliens and anyone who helped them enter or remain in the US as felons. As part of the wider immigration debate, most of the protests not only sought a rejection of this bill, but also a comprehensive reform of the country's immigration laws that included a path to citizenship for all illegal immigrants.

The 2006 immigration protests were a series of demonstrations that began in Chicago and continued throughout major cities nationwide for a period of eight weeks. The first major demonstration in Chicago was held on March 10, 2006, and was estimated to have about 100,000 participants. It was the initial impetus for many of the other protests which followed throughout the country.  The largest single protest occurred on March 25, 2006, in downtown Los Angeles with an official estimate of more than 500,000 people marching in what organizers called "La Gran Marcha" ("The Great March") . Organizers of La Gran Marcha, however, state that the actual revised number of participants is somewhere between 1.25 and 1.5 million estimated through later photographic analysis.   The largest nationwide day of protest occurred on April 10, 2006, in 102 cities across the country, with 350,000–500,000 in Dallas. The overwhelming majority of the protests were peaceful and attracted modest media attention. Additional protests took place on May Day.

May Day 

The marches reached a climax on May 1, 2006, and were nicknamed "A Day Without Immigrants." Naming the protests in such way encouraged immigrants and aliens to quit their daily labor-intensive jobs for a day to draw attention to their significant contributions to U.S. daily life. Latino immigrants and aliens across the country were urged to boycott work, school and other economic activities. Those outside the Latino community were shocked to see the growing workforce of janitors, nannies, restaurant workers and many other service workers leave their jobs to join the protests. The mobilization of working-class illegal aliens was intended to challenge the belief that the United States would be able to prosper without illegal immigrants.

The protests took place on May 1, a date meant to honor workers throughout the country. The May 1st marches reflected the immigrant protesters' identities as workers and significant contributors to U.S. society. Most immigrants of Latin American descent come to the United States seeking economic prosperity for themselves and their families, they infrequently accept low wage jobs to survive in the United States. Therefore, missing work for a day burdened their families. Yet, thousands of immigrants risked their jobs and joined the marches to demand political recognition.

Illegal immigration  
Mexicans were not considered "immigrants" until 1960, when the United States issued visas to emigrate to America. Before 1960, Mexicans could only apply for work visas as Braceros or cross the border without inspection. Mexicans didn't have a "legal" way to enter the United States before then.

To understand the 2006 immigrant protests and the discourse behind illegal immigration as a leading topic in U.S. political debate, it is necessary to understand the history of illegal immigration. Since the 19th century, mass illegal immigration from Latin American countries to the United States has greatly impacted Latino politics. Illegal immigrants are individuals who arrive and live in the United States without legal documentation. In many cases, individuals arrive to the United States with legal documentation such as tourist or student visas and overstay the amount of time they are allowed to remain in the United States, thus becoming illegal immigrants. Many others cross the borders between the United States and Mexico, or the United States and Canada, without legal documentation. Today, undocumented entry to the United States is a misdemeanor.
Illegal immigration did not always exist to the extent that it does today. Before 1965, the United States did not have numerical restrictions on immigration from countries in the western hemisphere. In 1965, the United States passed the Immigration Nationality Act and repealed the 1924 National Origins Act designed to limit migration from southern and eastern European countries, thus making it possible for eastern-hemisphere countries to have equal access to visas in addition and consequently restricting migration from the western hemisphere for the first time. Furthermore, the 1965 Act provided unlimited number of visas for family reunification because it allowed naturalized U.S. citizens and permanent residents to request permission to bring their family members to the United States. The 1965 Act influenced Latinos/as citizens and permanent residents to request visas that allowed their family members to immigrate to the United States. This resulted in a shift of the country's ethno racial makeup and the creation of a large Latino population in the United States. The 1965 Act's restriction on the number of visas allotted to western hemisphere countries created the phenomenon of large scale illegal western hemisphere migration, particularly from Latin American countries like Mexico.

In the 1980s, the United States government began to express concern about the large scale flow of illegal immigration, which led to the Immigration Reform and Control Act (IRCA) of 1986. First, the Act made it illegal for employers to hire workers who could not provide proof of legal immigration to the United States. Second, it allowed for the legalization of immigrants who could prove residency in the U.S. since January 1, 1982 and agricultural workers who began working in the United States prior to May 1986. Out of the 3 million migrants that applied for IRCA, 2.7 million, many of whom were Mexican, were given a path to citizenship. However, in the long term, IRCA was not successful in reducing the flow of illegal immigration to the United States. As a result, the U.S. government began to increase the funding of Border Patrol as a means to regulate the flow of undocumented immigrants to the United States. These actions proved to have little impact on illegal immigration, resulting in about eleven million illegal immigrants living in the United States, the majority being of Mexican origin. Therefore, discourse about the flow of illegal immigration has been known as a "Mexican" or "Latino" problem. The large scale flow of illegal migrants and the significant ethno-racial shift that occurred as a result of 1965 Act, have resulted in anti-immigrant backlash that targets Latino immigrants.

Role of Spanish-language media and religious leaders 
Spanish-language media outlets, in particular Univision, Telemundo, Azteca América and La Opinión (Los Angeles' largest Spanish newspaper), advertised the protests on their front page. They called it a "Mega Marcha", a mega march, as a way to emphasize the large scale of the marches. This strategy allowed for the spread of mobilizations throughout the country.  KMEX- TV in Los Angeles, an Univision owned and operated television station, called the protests "Pisando Firme", stepping strong, to remind protesters to march "with pride, with dignity, with order, for your children, for your people, for your community." Although television and newspapers effectively mobilized protesters, it was radio stations which truly promoted the protests.

Various Spanish-language radio stations across the country, in large part aided in mobilizing people for the protests. Eddie "Piolín" Sotelo, a Spanish-language radio personality from Los Angeles, persuaded eleven of his counterparts from Spanish-language radio stations based in Los Angeles to also rally listeners to attend planned protests. Piolin Por La Mañana, is known to be one of the most popular radio shows in the country. The Piolín's radio show, recorded near Los Angeles, is broadcast in 47 markets across the country including Chicago, Dallas, Houston, Miami, Phoenix, San Francisco and New York, many of the cities where the protests took place. In addition to mobilizing thousands of immigrant protestors, Eddie "Piolin" Sotelo made multiple appearances during protests, which increased his moral authority towards his Latino audience.

Religious leader Cardinal Roger M. Mahony, from the Archdiocese of Los Angeles, showed his support of immigrant protesters and urged Catholics, many of whom are Latino, to support the protests. He urged the Catholic community to spend Lent fasting and praying for an immigration reform that would counteract HR-4437 and the criminalization of immigrants. Cardinal Mahony made an official statement against HR-4437 through which he instructed Catholic priests to defy any law that required them to ask immigrants for legal documents. He stated that immigration was not about politics, rather the way in which human beings treat one another, while asserting that all Americans are of immigrant ancestry and share universal citizenship.

It was not media alone that mobilized protesters, rather the media in partnership with migrant organizations and leaders. When analyzing the immigrant civic participation in the 2006 protests simply acknowledging the media's influence is not enough. It absolutely necessary to understand the "meta-network" of activists and leaders that used media as a call to action.

Controversy and backlash over flag symbolism and protests 
The initial protests caused much controversy after some protesters waved Mexican and Central American flags instead of American flags. Various talk-radio hosts and columnists played up the contentious nature of displaying non-U.S. flags during the protests. One particular incident referred to involved a protest at Montebello High School in California, where a Mexican flag was raised on a flagpole over a United States flag flying in the distressed (or upside-down) position.

As part of the backlash over the protests and the controversy over the flag symbolism issue, a group calling themselves "Border Guardians" burned a Mexican flag in front of the Mexican Consulate in Tucson, Arizona, on April 9, 2006. The following day the group proceeded to burn two Mexican flags during protest in Tucson which was estimated to have had 15,000 participants. After the police seized a student who had thrown a water bottle at the "Border Guardians", they followed the police officers calling for them to let the student go. As the situation escalated violence broke out and 6 were arrested with dozens being pepper-sprayed. The next day the police arrested the leader of the Border Guardians, Roy Warden, for charges including assault and starting a fire in a public park.

Because of the controversy, organizers of the protests encouraged protesters to leave their Mexican flags at home, with Cardinal Roger Mahony telling Los Angeles protesters to not fly any flag other than the United States flag because, "...they do not help us get the legislation we need." As a result of this controversy later protests featured fewer Mexican flags and more protesters carrying American flags.

In addition, California's Oceanside Unified School District banned flags and signs from its campuses after "Mexican flag-wavers clashed with U.S. flag-wavers."

Backlash
The Washington Post reported that, in the Washington, D.C. suburb of Herndon, a day labor center at which suspected illegal aliens gathered was closed and its mayor and two aldermen lost reelection, in part due to immigration concerns.

Membership in the Minuteman Project increased due in part to backlash from the protests. On May 3, responding to the May 1 boycotts, the Minutemen embarked on a caravan across the United States in an effort to bring attention to a need for border enforcement. The caravan was expected to reach Washington, D.C. on May 12.

Regarding the Tucson-based anti-immigration movement: In 2006, the Southern Poverty Law Center wrote: "Roy Warden, 59, emerged this spring as one of the country's most controversial, volatile, and, many believe, dangerous characters of the anti-immigration movement."

Consequences of the 2006 immigration protests 
Although HR-4437 failed to pass through the Senate, it left a trail of consequences that affected the immigrant community. One of those consequences was intensive Immigration Customs Enforcement (ICE) raids during the final years of the Bush administration which continued throughout the Obama presidency. In the next couple of years, more than 300,000 undocumented immigrant were deported to their home countries, that is 100,000 more than the number of deported immigrants in 2005, a year before the protests. The increase in deportations caused fear of retaliation within the undocumented community and resulted in rapid demobilization.

Although HR-4437 did not become a law at the federal level, it did not prevent individual states from passing similar laws. In 2006, Pennsylvania passed the Illegal Immigration Relief Act, which fined landlords who rented housing to undocumented immigrants and also fined business owners who hired them. The State of Arizona passed S.B. 1070, which led to racial profiling and required police officers to request legal documentation from anyone they suspected was undocumented. Both laws, along with similar others, were deemed unconstitutional in part because the U.S. Constitution assigns control over immigration to the federal government, not individual states.

Latino political contributions and civic engagement 

Since undocumented immigrant communities were unable to vote, lobby, or influence politicians in more traditional ways, Latino leaders mobilized immigrants through non-voting activities, such as protests. Many Latinos indicated that the marches were the beginning of a new social and political movement that sought to gain civic empowerment. A report released by the Pew Hispanic Center indicated that Latinos would most likely vote in subsequent elections and The National Immigration Forum found that Latino voters were more enthusiastic to vote in 2006 due to the immigration debate, and the need to prevent legislation like HR-4437 from being approved by Congress. "Today we march, tomorrow we vote," was one of the most popular slogans during the 2006 immigrant protests. Such slogan indicated the value and need for Latino/a political contribution and recognition.

Timeline

March
 March 10: 100,000 marched from Union Park to Federal Plaza in Chicago but organizers say that about 250,000- 500,000 actually marched.
 March 24: 20,000 marched to Senator Jon Kyl's office in Phoenix. Tens of thousands of workers participate in a work stoppage in Georgia.
 March 25: more than 500,000 (casual police estimate) march in downtown Los Angeles, but organizers claim more than 1.25 million based on photographic analysis 
 March 26: 7,000 people rallied at the Statehouse in Columbus, Ohio.
 March 27:  Hundreds of high school students walk out of class in protest in Northern Virginia .
 March 29: 8,000–9,000 marched from The Coliseum to Legislative Plaza in Nashville.
 March 30: Robert Pambello, the principal of Reagan High School in Houston, placed a Mexican flag below the American and Texan flags and was ordered to remove it. He later resigned from his position for apparently unrelated reasons. In South West Houston, high school students from Robert E. Lee High, Bellaire High, Sam Houston High School (joining from Houston's Northside) and other middle schoolers joined in a march that was taken to city hall.
 March 31: 3,000 high school and middle school students in Las Vegas walk out of class to protest. Some college and community college students join them on their protest.

April
 April 1: 10,000 marched across the Brooklyn Bridge to Foley Square in New York City.
 April 6: Hundreds of Aurora, Illinois students left school to march downtown to protest.
 April 8: Several hundred people rally at Chicano Park in San Diego.
 April 9: Demonstrations in several cities across the United States, including:
 50,000 marched in San Diego from Balboa Park, through downtown to the County Administration Building.

 6,000 protested in Des Moines, Iowa at Nollen Plaza in support of comprehensive immigration reform., April 9
 April 10: Demonstrations were staged in many cities and towns across the United States;
 Atlanta, Georgia, at least 50,000 people rallied both for and against amnesty.
 Boston, Massachusetts, approximately 2,000 demonstrators march from Boston Common to Copley Square.
 Charleston, South Carolina, at least 4,000 people gathered and protested the inability of lawmakers to agree on legislation that would lead to citizenship.
 Fort Myers, Florida, an estimated 75,000 people took part in "The Great March" which affected traffic in nearby areas of the march.  The stream of protesters was at least a mile long at times.
 Las Vegas, a well-organized march of approximately 3,000 people was held. Protesters marched two miles from Jaycee Park to the Federal Courthouse during the first day of the Clark Country Spring Break, waving Mexican and American flags alike. They protested in favor of amnesty.
 New York City, between 70,000 and 125,000 people demonstrated in front of City Hall.  Senators Hillary Clinton and Chuck Schumer spoke at the rally.  Neither called for amnesty, though many of the crowd's signs and chants did.
 Oakland, California, an estimated 10,000 people took part in the demonstration.
 Salt Lake City, Utah, a unity rally was held at the City-County Building; there were an estimated 15,000 protesters.
 San Jose, California, an estimated 25,000 demonstrators marched several miles from King and Story to city hall. Highway access to US 101 and I-680 was closed, causing significant traffic backups.
 Seattle, between 15,000 and 25,000 marched to a rally at the federal building where speakers in support of the demonstrators, such as Mayor Greg Nickels and County Executive Ron Sims spoke.  Just five thousand were expected.
 April 11: Several protests occurred in Nevada.
 In Las Vegas, a rally with an estimated minimum of 300+ was held at the Cashman Center; several important opposition figures showed up, such as Jim Gilchrist, the Nevada Secretary of State, local radio host Mark Edwards, and numerous state Minuteman Project branches to protest against amnesty.
 In Carson City, Nevada, an estimated 200 students walked out of class, rallying in front of the Governor's Mansion.
 In Reno, Nevada, between 2,000 and 4,000 protesters marched through the downtown area, from the University of Nevada, Reno campus to the Bruce R. Thompson Federal Building, and continued to a designated spot near the Meadowood Mall. Traffic was held and diverted along South Virginia Street during the march.
 April 13:  Students from several Woodburn, Oregon (a town with a large Hispanic community) schools marched out of class.
 April 19: Students from various Denver high schools and middle schools walked out of class and marched to the capitol.
 April 27: Approximately 200 volunteers and supporters built a 6 foot high, quarter mile section of barbed wire fencing along the Mexico and United States border to send a clear message to Americans and leaders in Washington regarding the lack of security at our borders.
 April 28: Nuestro Himno, a Spanish language rendition of the Star Spangled Banner, is played simultaneously on about 500 Spanish language radio stations across the country. The controversy died in a few days, after it was revealed that Cuban immigrant Jon Secada had sung the anthem in Spanish at Bush inauguration ceremony , and that a Spanish version of the anthem had been commissioned by the Bureau of Education of the United States in 1919 .

May

 May 1: The "Great American Boycott" takes place across the United States and at a few locations abroad.
 An estimated 400,000 marched in Chicago, according to police, though organizers pegged the total at closer to 700,000; "Latinos were joined by immigrants of Polish, Irish, Asian and African descent."
 An estimated 400,000 marched in Los Angeles, according to police
 The boycott was said to have had "little economic impact" in Arizona
 Modesto, California saw close to 10,000 people marching in the streets, possibly the largest assembly of people in the city's history. Major city streets were shut down as a direct result.
 Over 15,000 protesters were reported in Santa Barbara, California.
 Some supporters have hailed this as "the most important boycott since the days of the civil rights movement".
 Over 100,000 marched in the Bay Area of California.
 At least 10,000 marched in Orange County
 A minor disturbance in Vista, California was disbursed by 200 police officers.
 Local news estimates that 3,000+ people marched from Jaycee Park in Las Vegas, Nevada; some local businesses suffered but the majority of businesses felt no financial impact.
 According to LA Observed, an altercation occurred between protestors and police at MacArthur Park in Los Angeles.

 Thousands of immigrants and their supporters did not go to work or school in Iowa United for the Dignity and Safety of Immigrants (UDSI) (organizing group estimates)
 May 2: The Minuteman Project says that 400 new members joined in April in response to the protests.
 May 3: In response to the pro-immigration reform boycott, the Minutemen started a two-vehicle caravan across the United States which reached Washington, D.C. on May 12.
 May 25: The United States Senate passes S. 2611 which includes a path to citizenship for up to 8.5 million illegal aliens. The bill eventually failed and was never enacted.

Legislation

H.R. 4437 (The Border Protection, Anti terrorism, and Illegal Immigration Control Act of 2005) was passed by the United States House of Representatives on December 16, 2005, by a vote of 239 to 182.  It is also known as the "Sensenbrenner Bill", for its sponsor in the House of Representatives, Jim Sensenbrenner. H.R. 4437 was seen by many as the catalyst for the 2006 U.S. immigration reform protests.

The Immigration Reform and Control Act of 1986 previously gave "amnesty" to 2.7 million undocumented immigrants. Proponents of the measure, including then-President Reagan, said the measure, paired with stricter employer rules and a better path for legal entry, would reduce illegal immigration.

The companion bill passed by the United States Senate was S. 2611, which never passed conference committee. The House Republican leadership stated that it rejected S. 2611 wholly and would only pass legislation that addressed border security. The end of the 109th Congress marked the death of this bill.

Kennedy ruling
The USA Supreme Court on June 16, 2008, ruled in Dada v. Mukasey, per ponente Justice Kennedy ruled (5–4) "that someone who is here illegally may withdraw his voluntarily agreement to depart and continue to try to get approval to remain in the United States." The Court held that complying with a deportation order did not strip an immigrant of the right to appeal that deportation order. The lawsuit is about 2 seemingly contradictory provisions of immigration law. One prevents deportation by voluntary departure from the country. The other section allows immigrants who are here illegally but whose circumstances have changed to build their case to immigration officials, and who must remain in the US. In the case, Samson Dada, a Nigerian citizen, overstayed beyond the expiration of his tourist visa in 1998. Immigration authorities ordered him to leave the country as he agreed to leave voluntarily, but to allow his legal re-entry, unlike if he had been deported.

Organizations 
The following organizations mobilized from hundreds (FAIR) to millions of people (Great American Boycott) around immigration reform in the United States during 2006.
 May 1, 2006  'A Day Without Immigrant' National Mobilization Endorsers' – national coalition of 215 organizations that mobilized one million protesters across the U.S. on May 1, 2006, for the Great American Boycott.
 We Are America Alliance – national network of hundreds of regional coalitions that mobilized 2 million protesters across the U.S. on April 10, 2006, and coordinated protests in the May 1 national protests
 El Paro and the Day Without and Immigrant Coalition (Philadelphia Region) Philadelphia regional coalition of dozens of organizations invited and mobilized thousands of protesters in 7 marches from February 14 to April 10, 2006.
 Kentucky Coalition for Immigrant and Refugee Rights – Kentucky coalition that mobilized an estimated 10,000 people in downtown Lexington, Kentucky on April 10, 2006, with other mobilizations around the state.
 March 25 Coalition – Southern California-based coalition that mobilized 750,000 protesters in Los Angeles on March 25, 2006
 Federation for American Immigration Reform (FAIR) – mobilized dozens of people in various counter-protests
 Minuteman Project – held sporadic counter-protests in some major US cities

Recruiting methods
Typically anti-illegal immigration movements focus on grassroots recruiting tactics; the Minutemen Civil Defense Corps and Minuteman Project use these methods to boost membership. After the 2006 immigration reform protest, anti-immigration movement participation increased by 600%.

Cooperation between anti-illegal immigration groups
Anti-illegal immigration groups often do not pursue the same agenda in the same ways; however, they do form coalitions when their agendas match other movements. One of the major joint efforts that these groups engage in is access to mailing lists for individuals who have donated money in the past to support the movement; Federation for American Immigration Reform and Minutemen Civil Defense Corps have shared lists of mailers with one another in recent years.

See also
 H.R. 4437
 Immigrant Nation! The Battle for the Dream, documentary movie
 March 2006 LAUSD student walkouts
 S. 2611
 United States immigration debate

References

External links
 Immigration Debate Resources – A website with education facts concerning the immigration debate

Conflicts in 2006
Immigration reform protests
Immigrant rights activism
Civil disobedience
Immigration to the United States
Mexican-American history
Protests in the United States
United States immigration reform
Protest marches in Chicago
Immigration-related protests
Hispanic and Latino American-related controversies